KOKO-LP (96.3 FM, "96.3 KOKO FM") is a radio station licensed to serve the community of Hana, Hawaii. The station is owned by KOKO FM and airs a Hawaiian music format.

The station was assigned the KOKO-LP call letters by the Federal Communications Commission on February 10, 2015.

References

External links
 Official Website
 FCC Public Inspection File for KOKO-LP
 

OKO-LP
OKO-LP
Radio stations established in 2015
2015 establishments in Hawaii
Hawaiian music
Maui County, Hawaii